Kozłówki  is a village in the administrative district of Gmina Kietrz, within Głubczyce County, Opole Voivodeship, in south-western Poland, close to the Czech border.

The village has a population of 184 as of 2007.

Notable residents
Alexander Andrae (1888-1979), Luftwaffe general

References

Villages in Głubczyce County